Kwoiek Needle is a  mountain summit located in the Lillooet Ranges of southwestern British Columbia, Canada. The mountain was named in association with Kwoiek Creek, Kwoiek Lake, and Kwoiek Peak. Kwoiek is a Thompson Indian word meaning "gouged out," referring to a large chunk missing from the canyon wall. The name was officially adopted on October 6, 1936, by the Geographical Names Board of Canada. Meltwater from unnamed glaciers on its north slopes and precipitation runoff from the peak drains into Kwoiek Creek and Log Creek, both tributaries of the Fraser River.

Climate

Based on the Köppen climate classification, Kwoiek Needle is located in a subarctic climate zone of western North America. Most weather fronts originate in the Pacific Ocean, and travel east toward the Coast Mountains where they are forced upward by the range (Orographic lift), causing them to drop their moisture in the form of rain or snowfall. As a result, the Coast Mountains experience high precipitation, especially during the winter months in the form of snowfall. Winter temperatures can drop below −20 °C with wind chill factors below −30 °C. The months July through September offer the most favorable weather for climbing Kwoiek Needle.

Climbing Routes
Established climbing routes on Kwoiek Needle:

 West Ridge -  
 Southeast Ridge -   
 Southwest Ridge - 
 Northwest Ridge -

See also

 Geography of British Columbia
 Geology of British Columbia

References

External links
 Weather: Kwoiek Needle

Two-thousanders of British Columbia
Pacific Ranges
Yale Division Yale Land District